Giniel de Villiers (born 25 March 1972 in Barrydale, South Africa) is a South African racing and rally driver, best known for winning the 2009 Dakar Rally.

Biography

De Villiers began his career in circuit racing, winning the domestic South African touring car championship four times in succession from 1997 to 2000 with a dealer-backed Nissan Primera. Switching to off-road racing thereafter, de Villiers made his Dakar Rally debut in 2003 driving for the works Nissan team. Finishing fifth overall at first attempt alongside navigator Pascal Maimon, de Villiers took his first stage victory in 2004 on the way to seventh overall in the standings (this time alongside François Jordaan) and won two stages in 2005, ending fourth overall (alongside Jean-Marie Lurquin).

De Villiers switched his allegiance to Volkswagen when Nissan withdrew their factory team at the end of 2005, taking another stage win and the runner-up position in the overall standings in 2006 along with navigator Tina Thorner – fifteen minutes behind Mitsubishi's Luc Alphand. Engine trouble prevented de Villiers and his new navigator Dirk von Zitzewitz finishing any higher than eleventh overall in 2007, in spite of four stage victories.
In 2009, de Villiers and Zitzewitz took the overall victory, albeit largely as a result of their teammate Carlos Sainz retiring whilst in a commanding position. More engine trouble in 2010 prevented de Villiers and von Zitzewitz from being able to defend their crown, the pair finishing just seventh overall, but they were able to finish in a strong runner-up position to teammate Nasser Al-Attiyah in 2011 with another stage victory.

De Villiers and Zitzewitz joined the South African Imperial Toyota team for the 2012 and 2013 event as a result of Volkswagen's withdrawal. They finished in third position in 2012 and a credible second place overall in 2013 despite taking no stage victories. In 2014, de Villiers and Zitzewitz were the best non-Mini crew, winning the final stage of the rally to cement fourth place overall – de Villiers' eighth top five finish in 11 Dakar starts.

De Villiers also took part in the 2009 Race of Champions, forming an 'All-Star' team alongside David Coulthard. The pair however failed to advance from the group stages of the Nations Cup competition, whilst de Villiers finished bottom of his group during the individual event.

The opportunity to compete in the local championship has given De Villiers the opportunity to return to a championship he won a decade ago. But more than that, it gives him significantly more seat time in the Toyota Gazoo Racing SA Hilux, and the Toyota Kalahari Botswana 1,000 Desert Race is the perfect place to hone his skills in preparation for Dakar 2018.

Dakar Rally results

References

South African rally drivers
Off-road racing drivers
1972 births
Living people
Dakar Rally drivers
Dakar Rally winning drivers
White South African people
Toyota Gazoo Racing drivers
Nürburgring 24 Hours drivers
South African racing drivers
Volkswagen Motorsport drivers